Abdul Karim Abdul Hussein al-Azri is an Iraqi politician born in Kadhimiya in 1908, and died in London at the age of 100.

He studied economics and political science at the University of London.

He held various positions in the monarchy in Iraq. He was consul for Iraq in 1930 in Kermanshah, Foreign Minister and Minister of Reconstruction several times, in addition to his work in the Teachers' House and Secretary of the Minister of Education and then aide to the President of the Royal Court, in the monarchy of Iraq.

Abdul Karim al-Azri is the son of Iraqi writer and journalist Abdul Hussein al-Azri and brother of the minister Abdul Amir al-Azri.

His book, A History of Memories of Iraq 1930–1958, was published in 1982.

References 

1908 births
Foreign ministers of Iraq
Finance ministers of Iraq
2008 deaths
Iraqi expatriates in the United Kingdom